Guam Highway 17 (GH-17) (named Cross Island Road) is one of the primary automobile highways in the United States territory of Guam.

Route description
GH-17 provides a more direct route across the southern part of the island, running from GH-5 in the western village of Santa Rita to GH-4 along the east coast in Yona. GH-4A also splits off the road in Talofofo to provide a more southerly connection to GH-4.

Major intersections

References

17